Mynkivtsi may refer to the following places in Ukraine:

 Mynkivtsi — Kyiv Oblast, Bila Tserkva Raion
 Mynkivtsi — Rivne Oblast, Dubno Raion
 Mynkivtsi — Khmelnytskyi Oblast, Kamianets-Podilskyi Raion
 Mynkivtsi — Khmelnytskyi Oblast, Shepetivka Raion